Hetz is a Hebrew word meaning arrow. It can refer to several things:
 The Israeli Arrow missile defense system

People with the surname
 Gerhard Hetz (born 1942), German Olympic swimmer